Great Britain sent a delegation to compete at the 1964 Summer Paralympics in Tokyo, Japan. Its athletes finished second in the gold and overall medal count.

Medalists

Medals by sport

See also 
 Great Britain at the Paralympics
 Great Britain at the 1964 Summer Olympics

References 

Nations at the 1964 Summer Paralympics
1964
Summer Paralympics